Rugby league nines at the 2015 Pacific Games was held from 11–12 July 2015 at Sir John Guise Stadium. Hosts Papua New Guinea won the gold medal, defeating Samoa in the final by 38–10. Tonga took the bronze medal, defeating the Cook Islands by 16-14 in the third place match. PNG's Wartovo Puara Jr was named Player of the Tournament.

Medal summary

Medal table

Results

Teams

Matches

Preliminary round

Finals

Rankings

See also
 Rugby league at the Pacific Games

References

2015 Pacific Games
2015
2015 in rugby league
Rugby league nines
2015 in Papua New Guinea rugby league